Chaibasa is a town and a municipality in West Singhbhum district in the state of Jharkhand, India. Chaibasa is the district headquarters of West Singhbhum district. It is also the headquarter of Singhbhum Kolhan division headed by the Divisional commissioner.

Geography 
It has an average elevation of 222 metres. It is located 140 km south of state capital Ranchi, 25 km from Chakradharpur, and 65 km from Jamshedpur.

Climate

Demographics 

 India census, Chaibasa had a population of 69,565. The total number of householders was 10596. The male population stood at 36273 and the female population at 33292 (with the sex ratio at 100%:91,8%). Chaibasa has an average literacy rate of 86.93%, higher than the national average of 59.5%, with male literacy rate of 91.60% and female literacy rate of 81.83%. Scheduled Castes and Scheduled Tribes make up 6.52% and 25.70% of the population respectively. 12% of the population is under 6 years of age.

Due to its status as an industrial hub, Chaibasa is a very multilingual city. Hindi (32.6%) and Urdu (13.0%) are the most-spoken languages. Ho (12.6%) and Odia (8.9%) are the local languages. Other languages spoken in Chaibasa include Bengali, Magahi, Bhojpuri, Marwari, Sadri, Maithili and Kurmali. Tribal languages spoken include Kurukh and Mundari.

Education 
There are a number of schools up to 10th and 12th standards in Chaibasa, including the Mangillal Rungta middle and high school, the St. Xavier's schools (some of which are in Lupungutu), the SPG school and many others (a Lutheran school, the Navodaya Vidyalaya, the Padmawati Jain Saraswati Sishu Vidya Mandir, the St. Mary's Public School in Gandhi Tola, the St. Viveka English Medium School, the Scott Hindi Girls school, the S. S. A. Niche Tola School, the Surajmull Jain DAV Public School or the Zila School). There is also the Kolhan Inter College and the DPS Inter College.

For higher education up to postgraduate degrees, Chaibasa has adequate colleges. The oldest and biggest one is Tata College, Chaibasa. Other two prominent colleges are GC Jain Commerce College and Mahila College. In 2009, Kolhan University was constituted with its head office at Chaibasa. In addition to the Chaibasa Engineering College, Chaibasa also boasts of a branch of the Industrial Training Institute (ITI) and the RAJ ITI.

Society (NGOs)

Both the Indian Red Cross Society and Rotary International have their centers in the municipality.

Economy 

Chaibasa is a district headquarters and constitutes all the Governmental offices of the district. Government Institutions are the chief employers of chaibasa. The cement manufacturer ACC Cement Works is situated in Jhinkpani, 18 km from Chaibasa, but relies on Chaibasa itself for daily needs. Substantial mining is done in the area by companies such as S.R. Rungta Group, Thakur Prasad Sao & Sons, Saha Brothers and Anil Khirwal. Many other small-scale steel manufacturing companies are situated in Chaibasa. Lfyd one of the biggest hyperlocal discovery startups of India founded by Satyajeet Patnayak & Dharam Chand Patnaik and currently backed by NASSCOM is registered from Chaibasa. 

Chaibasa's proximity to Jamshedpur and Kolkata contributes to its small scale industrial scape. The most popular economic engines are mining, textiles and service sector.

Chaibasa not being directly on Howrah-Mumbai main line has hurt its economy quite a lot and all the railway jobs and related industries moved to Chakradharpur which is a smaller town near to it that lies on the main line.

Transportation 

The best-connected place is Jamshedpur which is 60 km away from Chaibasa. The second best place is Chakradharpur, 25 km from Chaibasa on Howrah - Mumbai main line. There are two trains running from Jamshedpur which passes via Chaibasa.

One more train is running from Howrah i.e. Howrah Barbil Jan Shatabdi Express passes via Chaibasa. In 2012 another train from Chakradharpur–Barbil Intercity Express had started passing through Chaibasa.

In 2014 another weekly train started from Visakhapatnam - Tatanagar Weekly Superfast Express which also passes through Chaibasa. Capital of Jharkhand, Ranchi is 145 km away from Chaibasa.

Chaibasa is a station on the southbound line to Orissa from Rajkharsawan Junction on the  Tatanagar–Bilaspur section of Howrah-Nagpur-Mumbai line.

The city does not have a public airport, but there are some helipads.

Chaibasa is on the State Highway 5.

Hungry generation 
The exponents of famous literary and cultural movement Bhookhi Peedhi or Hungry generation, Samir Roychoudhury resided in this town for several decades after the 1950s.

Filmography 
Chaibasa has featured in the Zee TV show Service Wali Bahu.

See also
Chaibasa (Vidhan Sabha constituency)
Karaikella

References

Cities and towns in West Singhbhum district